Ajay Tamta (born 16 July 1972) is a politician from Uttarakhand, India. He represents Bharatiya Janata Party. He's currently Minister of State for Textiles and also Member of Parliament (MP) from Almora constituency. 

He contested 2009 Lok Sabha elections from Almora of Uttarakhand but lost. He was elected as member of Uttarakhand Legislative Assembly from Someshwar, Almora in 2012 elections as a member of Bharatiya Janata Party. He was elected to Lok Sabha in 2014 and 2019.

References

Living people
Uttarakhand politicians
Uttarakhand MLAs 2012–2017
People from Almora district
India MPs 2014–2019
Lok Sabha members from Uttarakhand
Bharatiya Janata Party politicians from Uttarakhand
1972 births
Narendra Modi ministry
India MPs 2019–present